Espaon is a commune in the Gers department in southwestern France.

Geography
In the western part of the commune, the river Gesse flows into the Save, which forms most of its western border.

Population

See also
Communes of the Gers department

References

Communes of Gers